The Aberdare Leader was a weekly English-language newspaper that was published between 1902 and 1991 in south Wales. It circulated in the Aberdare Valley, Mountain Ash, Merthyr Tydfil, Pontypridd and Glyn Neath.

The main content of the paper was local news. Between 1902 and 1967 the proprietors of the Aberdare Leader were W. Pugh and J. L. Rowlands, with the Celtic Press being the subsequent proprietor.

Welsh Newspapers Online has digitised almost 800 issues of the Aberdare Leader (1902–1919) from the newspaper holdings of the National Library of Wales.

See also
 The Aberdare Times (1869)

References 

Newspapers published in Wales
1902 establishments in Wales
1991 disestablishments in Wales
Publications disestablished in 1991
Publications established in 1902